The Pacific Palisades Conservation Area is a conservation area located along the Meramec River where St. Louis, Jefferson, and Franklin counties meet in Missouri, USA. It is named for the rock and sand formations along this portion of the Meramec River.

Pacific Palisades Conservation Area is a  tract between St. Louis and Jefferson counties. The area is divided into a wildlife area in Jefferson County and an access area, in St. Louis County. River access is only available from the St. Louis county section. Hunting is allowed only in the Jefferson County section.

The access area hosts a Meramec River access and is on the north shore of the Meramec River.

The wildlife area has a diverse ecology with two lakes,  of forest,  of prairie,  of field,  of cropland, a once-prominent ramp, and large bluffs along south bank of the Meramec River.

The area is good for hunting deer, turkey, and doves.  Herons and other waterfowl typically nest around the lakes. Large number of mussel beds are also located along this section of the Meramec River. Game fish species include bluegill, largemouth bass, and crappie.

References

Conservation Areas of Missouri
Protected areas of St. Louis County, Missouri
Protected areas of Jefferson County, Missouri
Protected areas of Franklin County, Missouri